The Silver Star is a 1955 American Western film directed by Richard Bartlett and starring Edgar Buchanan, Marie Windsor, Lon Chaney Jr., Earle Lyon and Richard Bartlett, Barton MacLane.

Plot
The old sheriff (Edgar Buchanan) handles three gunmen when the skittish new sheriff hides.

Cast
 Edgar Buchanan as Will 'Bill' Dowdy (as Edgar Buchanon)
 Marie Windsor as Karen Childress
 Lon Chaney Jr as John W. Harmon (as Lon Chaney)
 Earle Lyon as Sheriff Gregg Leech
 Richard Bartlett as King Daniels
 Barton MacLane as Henry 'Tiny' Longtree (as Barton McLane)
 Morris Ankrum as Charlie Childress
 Edith Evanson as Belle Dowdy
 Michael Whalen as Shakespeare 
 Steve Rowland as Bainey
 Robert Karnes as Ward Blythe (as Bob Karnes)
 Earl Hansen as 
 Tim Graham as Happy
 Bill Andres as Daniels Henchman
 Jill Richards as Stella
 Chris O'Brien as
 Charles Knapp

External links

American Western (genre) films
1955 films
1955 Western (genre) films
Lippert Pictures films
Films directed by Richard Bartlett
1950s English-language films
1950s American films
American black-and-white films